Nuria Aheela Dimandja (born 3 August 1994), known professionally as Nuriya Dimandja, is a Dutch-Congolese actress. She was born in Leiderdorp in The Netherlands.

Early life and education 
She was born on August 3, 1994 to Congolese parents. She  spent most of her teenage years in a small village, Alphen a/d Rijn in South-Holland. Where she was raised by her parents Merlyse and Dovell Dimandja. Her interest in acting started at the age of 11 years old. After she watched Quentin Tarantino's Kill Bill:Volume 1 starring actress Uma Thurman. She ended up moving out of Holland at 18 years old to attend university abroad. She obtained a Bachelors degree in International Business at Thomas More University in Belgium and a minor degree in business and finance at Shanghai Normal University. By the age of 23, she moved to New York City where she attended the William Esper Studio to pursue her acting career, with the support of her parents.

References 
https://www.imdb.com/name/nm11168770/bio/?ref_=nm_ql_1

External links 
 https://www.imdb.com/name/nm11168770/